José Miguel Guzmán (born 10 May 1937) is a Peruvian basketball player. He competed in the men's tournament at the 1964 Summer Olympics.

References

External links

1937 births
Living people
Peruvian men's basketball players
Olympic basketball players of Peru
Basketball players at the 1964 Summer Olympics
Sportspeople from Lima
20th-century Peruvian people